Saldías may refer to:

People
 Adolfo Saldías (1849–1914), Argentinian historian, lawyer, politician, soldier and diplomat
 Álvaro Lara Saldías (1984–2011), Chilean football player
 Antonio Saldías (born 1951), Chilean writer
 Marciano Saldías (born 1966), Bolivian football player
 Roberto Saldías (born 1993), Chilean football player
 Roque Augusto Saldías Maninat (1892–1974), Venezuelan-born Peruvian admiral and politician
 Washington Saldías Fuentealba (1927–1989), Chilean politician
 Washington Saldías González (born 1949), Chilean politician

Places
 Saldías, Navarre, Spain
 Saldías station, Buenos Aires, Argentina